Eleonora Vinogradova ( (November 16, 1931 – July 17, 2003) was a Ukrainian choir director, educator, professor, Honored Artist of the Ukraine (since 1978).

Biography
Eleonora Vinogradova was born in Grozny. In 1965, she graduated from the Kiev Conservatory (class of Eleonora Skrypchynska), since 1965 she became its teacher. Since 1966, she was a main chorus artistic director of the choir studio of boys “Dzvinochok” of the Kiev Palace of the Pioneers. In 1975, Vinogradova founded “Tonika”, the Center of directors, choirmasters and composers. She was a Head of this Center till 1990. In 1983-1986 she was a chorus artistic director and chief conductor of the children choir “Lubystok” under the Kiev Conservatory. In 1986-1997 she was an artistic director and chief conductor of the Boys' Choir in Kyiv secondary specialized musical boarding-school named after Mykola Lysenko. In 1997-2003 she was an artistic director and chief conductor of the Children’s Choir “Cantus” of Kyiv Musical School No. 5 named after Levko Revutsky. She was an outstanding Ukrainian choir conductor, Professor of the Kyiv P.I.Tchaikovsky Conservatory, Honored Artist of Ukraine.

Vinogradova was a compiler and redactor of 15 collected books for children choirs 

She died in 2003 in Kyiv and is buried in Baikove Cemetery.

References

External links
 - Article in "ZN,UA" newspaper 

Ukrainian music educators
1931 births
2003 deaths
20th-century conductors (music)